Avo Üprus (born January 10, 1954) is an Estonian politician. He was a member of X Riigikogu.

He has been a member of Res Publica Party.

References

Living people
1954 births
Members of the Riigikogu, 2003–2007
Place of birth missing (living people)
Res Publica Party politicians